Pollenia japonica is a species of cluster fly in the family Polleniidae.

Distribution 
Japan.

References 

Polleniidae
Insects described in 1966
Diptera of Asia